Ranko is a Slavic and Japanese given name.

People

People with the name Ranko include:

Slavic name "Ranko" (Cyrillic script: Ранко)
Ranko Borozan, footballer
Ranko Despotović, Serbian footballer
Ranko Đorđić, Serbian football player and manager
Ranko Golijanin, footballer
Ranko Krivokapić, Speaker of the Parliament of Montenegro and the President of the Social Democratic Party of Montenegro 
Ranko Marinković, Croatian novelist and dramatist
Ranko Markovic, film and television producer
Ranko Matasović, Croatian linguist
Ranko Moravac, footballer
Ranko Ostojić, Croatian politician
Ranko Popović, Serbian football player/coach
Ranko Radović, architect
Ranko Stojić, footballer
Ranko Veselinović, footballer 
Ranko Žeravica, Serbian basketball coach
Ranko Zirojević, footballer
Ranko Jurjević, Multimedijalni umetnik

Japanese name "Ranko"
Written 乱子,蘭子,らんこ,ランコ
Ranko Hanai (1918-1961), actress
, Japanese fashion model, television personality and singer

Fictional Characters

Ranko, an alternate persona for Ranma Saotome in Ranma ½
Ranko, a character from A Mother Should be Loved
Ranko, a character from SS
Ranko, a gorilla who features in the Tintin adventure The Black Island by Hergé
Ranko Yagyuu, a character from Fūma no Kojirō
Ranko Saōji, a character from Sankarea: Undying Love
Ranko Saegusa, a character from Binbō Shimai Monogatari
Ranko Mikogami, a secondary character in Sky Girls
Ranko Midorikawa, a character from Aim for the Ace!
Ranko Hata, a character from Seitokai Yakuindomo
Ranko Kanzaki, a character from The Idolmaster Cinderella Girls

See also
 Isolepis ranko (I. ranko), see List of Isolepis species
 Ranković

Japanese feminine given names
Slavic masculine given names
Serbian masculine given names